The Kazakhstan Super Cup (Qazaqstan Sýperkýbogy) is a one-match football annual competition. The two participating clubs are the Kazakhstan Premier League champion and the Kazakhstan Cup winner. If these two competitions are won by the same team, then the other participant will be the runner-up of Kazakhstan Premier League.

The inaugural edition of the trophy was in 2008.

Finals by year

Two-team format

Four-team format

Titles by team in Super Cup

The trophy
The material is made out of jasper at Jewellery Plant in Zlatoust. The height is 55 cm.

All-time top goalscorers

References

 
2
National association football supercups